Raymond Leo Biffin (born 6 May 1949 in Launceston) is a former Australian rules footballer who played with Melbourne in the Victorian Football League (VFL).

Launceston-born Ray Biffin went to the mainland in 1968 and joined Melbourne after starting his career in the NTFA. He was known for his robust physical approach to the game and played most games at either full-forward or fullback. He topped Melbourne's goalkicking in 1976 with 47 goals. When he left the club after the 1979 season he became coach of Dandenong. He is an inductee (No. 153) of the Tasmanian Football Hall of Fame.

He was also a cricketer. In the 1967–68 season he played a first-class match for Tasmania against the touring Indian team, making 10 runs and taking two wickets. When he took the wicket of Ajit Wadekar he became one of the small number of players who have taken a wicket with their first ball in first-class cricket.

See also
 List of Tasmanian representative cricketers

References

External links

DemonWiki profile
Cricinfo profile

1949 births
Living people
Australian cricketers
Australian rules footballers from Launceston, Tasmania
Cricketers from Launceston, Tasmania
Dandenong Football Club coaches
Melbourne Football Club players
North Launceston Football Club players
Tasmania cricketers
Tasmanian Football Hall of Fame inductees